Simon Jentzsch (born 4 May 1976) is a German retired footballer who played as a goalkeeper.

He appeared in 274 Bundesliga games over the course of 14 seasons, mainly with Wolfsburg (six years). He also represented in the competition Karlsruhe, TSV 1860 Munich and Augsburg.

Club career
Born in Düsseldorf, Jentzsch began his professional career at KFC Uerdingen (then named Bayer), moving in July 1995 to Karlsruher SC. He would have to wait until the 1998–99 season to become first-choice, with the club in the second division.

In July 2000, Jentzsch joined TSV 1860 Munich, helping the Bavarians to three consecutive mid-table positions upon which he signed with fellow Bundesliga side VfL Wolfsburg. In his first years he was an important part in the team's consolidation in the top flight, but lost his status midway through 2007–08 to Swiss Diego Benaglio, still appearing in 15 matches to help the Wolves to a final qualification to the UEFA Cup.

On 31 March 2009, Jentzsch's contract with Wolfsburg was terminated and, on 9 June, he signed a one-year deal with FC Augsburg in the second level. He played 33 games in his second year to help his new team reach the main category for the first time in its history; previously, in late November 2009, he extended his link a further two years.

Aged 35–36, Jentzsch was again the starter in the 2011–12 season, helping Augsburg finally avoid relegation while posting the joint-ninth best defensive record with 49 goals against. He retired at the end of the following campaign and, in 2014, joined Fortuna Düsseldorf as their goalkeeper coach.

International career
A German under-21 international, Jentzsch received one callup to the senior side, but never made his official debut.

References

External links
 Augsburg official profile 
 
 

1976 births
Living people
Footballers from Düsseldorf
German footballers
Association football goalkeepers
Bundesliga players
2. Bundesliga players
KFC Uerdingen 05 players
Karlsruher SC players
TSV 1860 Munich players
VfL Wolfsburg players
FC Augsburg players
Germany under-21 international footballers
Germany B international footballers